Pendleton Heights, also known as the William K. Pendleton House and Christman Manor at Pendleton Heights, is a historic home located on the campus of Bethany College, at Bethany, Brooke County, West Virginia. It was built in 1841, as a small, box like dwelling.  It was altered in 1872 by college president William K. Pendleton to take on a Gothic Revival-style of architecture like other buildings on campus.  It is a two-story brick residence with characteristic steep gable roofs and arched windows.

It was listed on the National Register of Historic Places in 1975.

References

Houses on the National Register of Historic Places in West Virginia
National Register of Historic Places in Brooke County, West Virginia
Gothic Revival architecture in West Virginia
Houses completed in 1841
Houses in Brooke County, West Virginia
Bethany College (West Virginia)
Pendleton family residences